Juan Garay (August 20, 1928 - May 2009) was an Argentine swimmer who competed at the 1948 Summer Olympics in the 400 m freestyle, 1500 m freestyle and the 4×200 m freestyle relay, reaching the final in the latter and coming 6th.

References

1928 births
2009 deaths
Argentine male swimmers
Swimmers at the 1948 Summer Olympics
Olympic swimmers of Argentina
Argentine male freestyle swimmers
Sportspeople from Buenos Aires Province
20th-century Argentine people